Donacaula forficella is a species of moth of the family Crambidae described by Carl Peter Thunberg in 1794. It is found in China (Heilongjiang), Europe and South Africa.

The wingspan is 25–30 mm. The forewings are yellow with a fuscous band along the upper margin of the cell and a fuscous spot at the lower angle of the cell. The moth flies from May to September depending on the location.

The larvae feed on Carex, Glyceria maxima and Phragmites.

References

External links
 Waarneming.nl 
 Lepidoptera of Belgium
 Donacaula forficella at UKMoths

Schoenobiinae
Moths described in 1794
Moths of Europe